Excellent may refer to:

 Excellent (album), by Propaganda, 2012
 "Excellent", a song by Sunday Service Choir from the 2019 album Jesus Is Born
 "Excellent", a catchphrase of Mr. Burns in the cartoon The Simpsons
 "Excellent!," a catchphrase of the title characters in the Bill & Ted movie franchise
 , a ship and a shore establishment of the Royal Navy

See also

 Excellence (disambiguation)
 Excellent ring, in commutative algebra 
 Most Excellent Majesty, a form of address in the United Kingdom